Stadion Batakan Balikpapan is a football stadium in Balikpapan, East Kalimantan, Indonesia. The stadium hosts Liga 2 club Persiba Balikpapan. The stadium has a capacity of 40,000.

The stadium hosted the opening ceremony of 2020 Liga 2 season on 14 March 2020.

References 

Persiba Balikpapan
Buildings and structures in Balikpapan
Buildings and structures in East Kalimantan
Sports venues in Indonesia
Sports venues in East Kalimantan
Sports venues in Balikpapan
Football venues in Indonesia
Football venues in East Kalimantan
Football venues in Balikpapan

Sports venues completed in 2017